Chembai Sangeetholsavam is an annual Carnatic music festival held in Guruvayur by the Guruvayur Devaswom (similar to the Thyagaraja Aradhana at Thiruvaiyaru) in memory of Chembai Vaidyanatha Bhagavatar, one of the titans of Carnatic classical music  and an ardent devotee of Lord Guruvayurappan.

History
Chembai had conducted the festival in the temple town on his own for about 60 years. He used to invite anyone interested in Carnatic music, from small children to renowned musicians of his time, to perform at the festival. In course of time, the scale of the festival rivaled the Thiruvaiyaru Thyagaraja Aradhana, which is recognized as one of the most important festivals of homage paid to Saint Thyagaraja. The Guruvayur Devaswom decided to take ownership of this festival after Chembai's death in 1974, renaming it as Chembai Sangeetholsavam in his memory.

The Festival

About 3000 musicians participate in this festival every year and it is held for about 12–15 days culminating on the Guruvayur Ekadasi day, when all the musicians sing five favorite songs of Chembai and also the Pancharatna Kritis of Thyagaraja.

The festival is getting more popular year after year and its duration has increased from three days in its inception to about 12–15 days now.

See also

List of Indian classical music festivals

References

Chembai
Music festivals in India
Carnatic classical music festivals
Festivals in Thrissur district
Music festivals established in 1910
Folk festivals in India
Hindu music festivals
Guruvayur